Thomas Oates DD (died 1623) was a Canon of Windsor from 1621 to 1623.

Career

He was educated at Magdalen College, Oxford where he graduated BA in 1596, MA in 1599, BD in 1609 and DD in 1618.

He was appointed:
Domestic Chaplain to William Herbert, 3rd Earl of Pembroke 1608
Chaplain to James I of England
Prebendary of Chamberlainwood in St Paul's 1618 - 1623
Rector of Stoke Hamond, Buckinghamshire
Rector of Great Cressingham, Norfolk 1621

He was appointed to the twelfth stall in St George's Chapel, Windsor Castle in 1621, and held the stall until 1623.

Notes 

1623 deaths
Canons of Windsor
Alumni of Magdalen College, Oxford
Year of birth missing